Friedrich Wilhelm Graf von Buxhoevden (Fyodor Fyodorovich Buksgevden; other spellings: Feodor Buxhoeveden, Buxhœwden, Buxhöwden) (September 14, 1750 Võlla, Governorate of Livonia – August 23, 1811 near Kullamaa) was a Russian infantry general and government official. Buxhoeveden commanded the Russian armies during the Finnish War.

Family 
The Buxhoevedens, a Baltic German family from Estonia, traced their roots to Bexhövede in Lower Saxony.

Buxhoevden's wife, countess Natalia Alexeyeva, was the illegitimate daughter of Grigory Orlov (1734–1783) by a lady of the court, but her mother – contrary to some claims – was not the Empress Catherine, but a member of the Apraksin family. Buxhoeveden's granddaughter Varvara Nelidova was a mistress of Nicholas I of Russia (1796–1855) for 17 years (1832–1855).

Career 
In 1805 Buxhoevden took part in the Battle of Austerlitz as a commander, contributing to the Third Coalition's failure to defeat Napoleon by being drunk during the battle.
In 1808 he  served as Commander-in-Chief in the Russian conquest of Finland, and led Russian troops during the initial battles of the Finnish War (1808-1809).

Estates 
Buxhoevden received the castle and lands of Koluvere in western Estonia after Duchess Augusta of Brunswick-Wolfenbüttel had died there in 1788 in suspicious circumstances. He also owned the villa and manor of Ligovo near Saint Petersburg.

Awards 
Russian Empire awards:

 Order of Saint George, 4th Degree (26 November 1774)
 Order of Saint George, 3rd Degree (22 August 1789)
 Order of Saint Anna (8 September 1790)
 Cross "For the Capture of Praga" (1794)
 Golden Weapon for Bravery with diamonds (1794)
 Order of Saint Vladimir, 2nd Class (1794)
 Order of Saint Alexander Nevsky (15 February 1797)
 Order of Saint Vladimir, 1st Degree (1806)
 Order of the Holy Apostle Andrew the First-Called (17 September 1807), diamond badges added in 1808
 Order of Saint George, 2nd Degree (27 April 1808)

Foreign state awards:

 Order of the White Eagle, 1795 from the Polish–Lithuanian Commonwealth
 Order of Saint Stanislaus, 1795, from the Polish–Lithuanian Commonwealth
 Order of the Black Eagle, from Kingdom of Prussia
 Order of Saint John of Jerusalem, from Kingdom of Prussia

See also 
 Albert of Buxhoeveden (c. 1165–1229) - an earlier member of the family

References

External links

 

 Biography
 From Buxhoeveden family tree

1750 births
1811 deaths
People from Muhu Parish
People from Kreis Ösel
Friedrich Wilhelm
Baltic-German people
Imperial Russian Army generals
18th-century Estonian people
19th-century Estonian people
Russian commanders of the Napoleonic Wars
Russian military personnel of the Finnish War
Russian people of the Kościuszko Uprising
Recipients of the Order of St. George of the Second Degree
Recipients of the Order of St. George of the Third Degree
Recipients of the Order of St. George of the Fourth Degree
Recipients of the Order of St. Vladimir, 1st class
Recipients of the Order of St. Vladimir, 2nd class
Recipients of the Order of St. Anna